Edward Smallwell (c.1720–1799) was an English bishop of St David's and bishop of Oxford.

Life
He was chaplain to George III in 1766, made canon of Christ Church, Oxford, in 1775, and obtained the degree of D.D. He was appointed in 1783 as bishop of St David's, and was then translated to Oxford in 1788. He was also rector of Batsford in Gloucestershire. He died at his palace at Cuddesdon.

References

Bibliography
 John Britton (1821), The History and Antiquities of the Cathedral Church of Oxford, p. 32.

1720 births
1799 deaths
Alumni of Christ Church, Oxford
Bishops of St Davids
Bishops of Oxford
18th-century Welsh Anglican bishops
18th-century Church of England bishops